Waimiha is a rural community in the Ruapehu District and Manawatū-Whanganui region of New Zealand's North Island.

It is located south of Te Kuiti and Benneydale, and north of Taumarunui and Ongarue.

History

Māori have lived in Waimiha for centuries, hunting birds from the forested hills.

The local Waimiha Marae is a tribal meeting ground of the Ngāti Maniapoto hapū of Te Ihingarangi. It includes Te Ihingarangi meeting house.

Waimiha developed after the railway opened in 1901, which was followed by sawmillers and farmers. Crown land in the area was prepared for settlement in the 1910s. By the 1920s there were general stores, boarding houses, stables, a post office, butchery and cinema.

In the late 1920s, under a government policy introduced by Āpirana Ngata, some Māori land owners received funds to convert their land into farmland. By the 1930s,  of Māori land at Waimihia had been converted. Some of this land was later sold off or consolidated into larger farms.

The Waimiha farm scheme was one of the Māori land blocks in the country to be successfully converted to farmland. Local Farmers' Union president Ngaronui Jones, who oversaw the conversion, also developed a farm on his own ancestral land.

Endean’s mill, New Zealand’s only surviving native timber sawmill, operated in the area between 1927 and 1996. The complete remnants of the mill are no longer usable. However, it remains on display as an open air museum, and has featured in photography exhibitions. Twenty-eight other abandoned sawmill sites have also been identified in the valley. Milling peaked in the 1940s.

The Waimiha Railway Station, extremely narrow Poro-o-Tarao railway tunnel and Picture Palace hall were landmarks in the town when the township was a stop on the North Island Main Trunk line, from the 1900s to the 1980s. Alfred Hamish Reed was recorded spending a night sleeping at the railway station in 1960.

The post office closed in 1988 and the last shop in 1991. In the 1990s Carter Holt Harvey replaced livestock farms with pine plantations.

Events

Waimiha is a stop on the New Zealand motorcycle racing circuit, and has featured in the course for the New Zealand Rally Championship.

Ruapehu District Council hold periodic community meetings at Waimiha for residents to raise concerns.

Education

A 3-roomed school and teacher's house was built in 1912. Waimihia School closed in 2005, after projected roll numbers dropped below the numbers required to teach literacy and numeracy.

See also 

 Waimiha Sawmilling Company Limited v Waione Timber Company

References

External links 

 Photo of closed school in 2016

Populated places in Manawatū-Whanganui
Ruapehu District